Leonardo Andrés Iglesias (born August 28, 1979, in Lanús, Buenos Aires Province) is an Argentine football forward, who is currently a free agent.

Career
Iglesias started his career in the regionalised Argentine 3rd division with Club Atlético Talleres de Remedios de Escalada in 1997. He has played for Gimnasia y Esgrima (ER), San Martín de Mendoza. Godoy Cruz, Club Atlético Tigre and Atlético Rafaela in the National 2nd Division in Argentina.

Iglesias has played for several teams outside Argentina these are; CD Logroñés, Burgos CF, Leonesa and CM Peralta in Spain, Villa Española in Uruguay and his current club, Ankaragücü and Kayserispor in Turkey.

Honours 
 Kayserispor
Turkish Cup (1): 2008
 Bursaspor
Süper Lig (1): 2009-10

External links
 BDFA profile
Profile at TFF.org

1979 births
Living people
Sportspeople from Lanús
Argentine footballers
Talleres de Remedios de Escalada footballers
Burgos CF footballers
CD Logroñés footballers
Cultural Leonesa footballers
Association football midfielders
Godoy Cruz Antonio Tomba footballers
Club Atlético Tigre footballers
Atlético de Rafaela footballers
Kayserispor footballers
MKE Ankaragücü footballers
Bursaspor footballers
Süper Lig players
Expatriate footballers in Turkey
Argentine expatriate sportspeople in Turkey
Argentine expatriate footballers